Gianduja may refer to:

 Gianduja (commedia dell'arte), a mask which represents Turin and Piedmont in general
 Gianduja (chocolate), a preparation of chocolate with hazelnut and almond paste

See also
 Gianduiotto, a Piedmontese chocolate whose shape resembles an upturned boat